Stephen Franklin (born September 26, 1988) is an American football linebacker who is currently a free agent. He was initially signed by the Cincinnati Bengals as an undrafted free agent in 2011. He also played for the Seattle Seahawks and the Jacksonville Jaguars. He played college football for Southern Illinois University. He also is no longer playing football . He works for zone 6.

Professional career
On April 27, 2012, Franklin was released by the Jaguars. He also works for zone 6.

References

External links
Cincinnati Bengals bio
Seattle Seahawks bio
Southern Illinois Salukis bio

1988 births
Living people
Players of American football from Kansas City, Missouri
American football linebackers
Southern Illinois Salukis football players
Cincinnati Bengals players
Seattle Seahawks players
Jacksonville Jaguars players
Sioux City Bandits players
Colorado Crush (IFL) players
Kansas City Phantoms players